Palpifer is a genus of moths of the family Hepialidae described by George Hampson in 1893. There are 10 described species found in south and east Asia and parts of Mexico.

Species of the genus possess large rounded and ascending palpi. Antennae short and setiferous (bristly). Legs hairy with spurs absent on tibia. Forewings without a bar between vein 1b and the median nervure. Veins 7, 8 and 9, 10 stalked in both wings. Veinlets in cell forked.

Species
Palpifer falkneri - Nepal
Palpifer hopponis - Taiwan
Palpifer madurensis - Madura
Palpifer murinus - India
Food plant: Colocasia
Palpifer pellicia - India
Palpifer sexnotatus - India/Japan
Recorded food plants: Amorphophallus, Colocasia
Palpifer sordida - Java
Recorded food plants: Alocasia, Amorphophallus, Dioscorea
Palpifer taprobanus - Sri Lanka
Palpifer tavoyanus - Myanmar
Palpifer umbrinus - India

References
2. John R Grehan Hepialidae - Palpifer

Hepialidae
Exoporia genera
Taxa named by George Hampson